New America, formerly the New America Foundation, is a think tank in the United States founded in 1999. It focuses on a range of public policy issues, including national security studies, technology, asset building, health, gender, energy, education, and the economy. The organization is based in Washington, D.C. and Oakland, California. Anne-Marie Slaughter is the chief executive officer (CEO) of the think tank.

In 2002 Newsweeks Howard Fineman called New America a "hive of state-of-the-art policy entrepreneurship." New America has been characterized as "liberal" by the Pacific Standard online magazine, "left-leaning" by The Washington Post newspaper, and "left-of-center" by the Capital Research Center organization.

History

New America was founded in 1999 by Ted Halstead, Sherle Schwenninger, Michael Lind, and Walter Russell Mead as the New America Foundation. The organization is headquartered in Washington, D.C., United States, and also has an office in Oakland, California.

Ted Halstead served as New America's founding President and CEO from 1999 to 2007. Steve Coll served as New America's second President, before being replaced by Anne-Marie Slaughter in 2013.

On June 27, 2017, Barry C. Lynn, the director of the anti-monopoly Open Markets program at New America, issued a statement, criticizing Google, one of the organization's main sponsors. On August 30, 2017, it became known that Lynn was fired, and the Open Markets program was closed. According to The New York Times newspaper, New America did it to please Google. In response to the decision to fire Lynn and his team, twenty-five former and current employees of the think tank signed a letter expressing concern about the extent to which sponsors are influencing New America's work.

Reportedly, Google made New America take this action because the researchers, including prominent young competition law scholar Lina Khan, had lauded the EU's antitrust ruling against Google. New America's president Anne-Marie Slaughter denied the allegations of improper influence by Google.

The foundation's Economic Growth Program, directed by New America co-founders Sherle Schwenninger and Michael Lind, aims to take a policy look at America and the world's economic problems. In 2011, the program commissioned a paper "The Way Forward: Moving From the Post-Bubble, Post-Bust Economy to Renewed Growth and Competitiveness" which warned of the severe economic problems America would face if continued on its current path.

Maya MacGuineas, who has worked at the Brookings Institution as well as on Wall Street, led the Committee and now leads Fix the Debt. After advising politicians from both parties, she serves as a trusted mediator on budget talks between Democrats and Republicans. In addition, in April 2010 the Committee's policy director, Marc Goldwein, joined President Obama's bipartisan Fiscal Commission.

Open Technology Institute
The Open Technology Institute (OTI) is the technology program of the New America Foundation. OTI formulates policy and regulatory reforms to support open architectures and open-source innovations and facilitates the development and implementation of open technologies and communications networks.

Commotion Wireless 

Commotion is an open source "device-as-infrastructure" communication platform that integrates users' existing cell phones, Wi-Fi-enabled computers, and other wireless-capable devices to create community- and metro-scale, peer-to-peer communications networks. The project builds on existing mesh wireless technologies and gained widespread attention when, in 2011, the U.S. State Department announced funding for Commotion to lower barriers for building distributed communications networks. The project has been described as the "Internet in a Suitcase" by The New York Times.

Red Hook Wi-Fi

Founded in 2011 through a collaboration with OTI and Commotion Wireless, Red Hook Wi-Fi is a mesh network which services residents of Red Hook, Brooklyn, in New York City. The Wi-Fi network reached prominence in 2012, when Hurricane Sandy shut down many internet and communication systems throughout the city, but Red Hook remained connected through its mesh network.

Assets and funding
As of 2017, the New America had net assets of $26,788,098. Top donors to the organization in 2021 included the Bill & Melinda Gates Foundation, Bloomberg Philanthropies, Ford Foundation, Rockefeller Foundation, and United States Department of State.Funding details as of 2018:

Board of directors
As of 2020:

 Helene D. Gayle; Chicago Community Trust, President and Chief Executive Officer
 William W. Gerrity, Treasurer; Gerrity Group, Chief Executive Officer
 Anne-Marie Slaughter, Chief Executive Officer
 Robert J. Abernethy; American Standard Development Company, Chairman
 David G. Bradley, Secretary; Atlantic Media, Chairman
 David Brooks; The New York Times, op-ed columnist
 Maxine Clark; Build-A-Bear Workshop, Founder
 Michael M. Crow; Arizona State University, President
 R. Boykin Curry; Eagle Capital, Partner
 James Fallows; The Atlantic, National Correspondent
 Tom Freston; Firefly3 LLC, Principal
 Atul Gawande; Harvard Medical School and School of Public Health, Professor
 Katherine Gehl; Venn Innovations, Founder
 Reid Hoffman; LinkedIn, Co-Founder
 Zachary Karabell; River Twice Research, President
 Ashton Kutcher; A-Grade Investments, Co-Founder
 Walter Russell Mead; Foreign Affairs & Humanities, Bard College, James Clarke Chace Professor
 Mona Mourshed; Global Social Responsibility and McKinsey & Company, Senior Partner & Head
 Sally R. Osberg; Camfed USA, Chair
 Ashley Swearengin; Central Valley Community Foundation, President and Chief Executive Officer
 Fareed Zakaria; Fareed Zakaria GPS and CNN, Host; The Washington Post, columnist

References

External links

 
 Open Technology Institute's website
 Commotion Wireless webpage
 Measurement Lab webpage
 "Health Care Reform: A Nonpartisan Look at the Issue Under Debate" (video) – Elizabeth Carpenter speaking at the University of Wisconsin School of Medicine and Public Health
 Terrorism in America After 9/11—"A comprehensive, up-to-date source of online information about terrorist activity in the United States and by Americans overseas since 9/11" by New America

 
1999 establishments in the United States
Centrist political advocacy groups in the United States
Foreign policy and strategy think tanks in the United States
Think tanks based in Washington, D.C.
Think tanks established in 1999